Khatanga Airport  is an airport in Krasnoyarsk Krai, Russia located  southeast of Khatanga.  It is a major airfield servicing medium-sized airliners.  Interceptor aircraft were based here in the 1970s, and the airfield may have been home to deployments from Bratsk.  Today it serves as a hub for North Pole tourist expeditions via Sredny Ostrov; however, the Arctic regions still remain sensitive military zones and Khatanga is the first stop requiring entry permission from Federal Security Service border guards.

One of its uses is as a diversion airport if a twin-engine airliner experiences engine problems while flying over Siberia; however, the airport is only equipped for landings during good weather.

Airlines and destinations

References
RussianAirFields.com

Russian Air Force bases
Soviet Air Force bases
Airports built in the Soviet Union
Airports in Krasnoyarsk Krai